Supermind, in Sri Aurobindo's philosophy of integral yoga, is the dynamic manifestation of the Absolute, and the intermediary between Spirit and the manifest world, which enables the transformation of common being into Divine being.

Description
By "Supermind", Sri Aurobindo means several things:
- Supermind is a plane between the "upper hemisphere" of pure being-consciousness and the "lower hemisphere" of life in the universe (mind, life, and matter). This plane enables the Real Ideas of the Supreme to manifest as forms of that force in creation. It is the power that enables creation, by dividing the Force into the forms, forces and powers in the universe.
- Supermind is a plane of perfect knowledge, that has the full, integral truth of anything. It is a plane that man can rise to, above his current limited mentality, and have perfect understanding through revelations and power that is leaning down on the earth's consciousness. One can open to it, in order to transform the various aspects of one's being, as well as set right the conditions of life, creating sudden good fortune ("instantaneous miraculousness") for the person opening to it.

Supramentalisation and the Gnostic being
According to Sri Aurobindo, full yogic development consists of two parts: the standard yogic goal of ascent into a formless and timeless self, and the descent and establishment of the supramental consciousness into Earthly life. Through integral yoga, one actualises the Supermind. The supramental consciousness transforms the entire being and leads to the divinisation of the material world.

This supramental transformation gives rise to a new individual, the Gnostic being, which is fully formed by the supramental power. Division and ignorance are overcome, and replaced with a unity of consciousness. The physical body will be transformed and divinised. The gnostic being sees the spirit everywhere in the world, and in every other person. This awareness eliminates the usual separation between man and life, and between people. One sees that all existences are various forms of the divine reality. Every individual existence in life plays a role in the unfolding of existence. The Gnostic beings can work together to create a new common life. This new life is superior to the present way of being. A critical mass of such "gnostic individuals" can create the foundation of a new social life and order. This will lead to a greater unity, mutuality, and harmony.

The Supramental Descent
On 29 February 1956, Sri Aurobindo's co-worker Mirra Alfassa (The Mother), announced, "The manifestation of the Supramental upon earth is no more a promise but a living fact, a reality. It is at work here, and one day will come when the most blind, the most unconscious, even the most unwilling shall be obliged to recognize it."

On 1 January 1969, The Mother (at age 90) announced the "arrival" of the "superman consciousness" – "the intermediary between man and the supramental being".

See also

 Evolution (metaphysics)
 Posthumanism and Posthuman
 Übermensch

References

Sources

 Sri Aurobindo (1977) The Life Divine, (Sri Aurobindo Ashram Trust),  (hardcover),  (paperback)
 Beatrice Bruteau (1974), Evolution towards Divinity (Theosophical Publishing House, Wheaton, Ill)
 David M. Brookman, Teilhard and Aurobindo: A Study in Religious Complementarity, Mayur Publications, 1988
 J. Chetany (1978), The Future of Man According to Teilhard de Chardin and Aurobindo Ghose, New Delhi, Oriental Publishers & Distributors
 Jan Feys, (1973) The Philosophy of Evolution in Sri Aurobindo and Teilhard de Chardin, Calcutta: Firma K. L. Mukhopadhyay
 Basant Kumar Lal, Contemporary Indian Philosophy Motilal Banarsidass, 1978  ; pp. 195 ff.
 George Nedumpalakunnel, Realization of God According to Sri Aurobindo: A Study of a Neo-Hindu Vision on the Divinization of Man Claretian Publications, 1979
K. D. Sethna (1973), Teilhard de Chardin and Sri Aurobindo - a Focus of Fundamentals, pp. 34–5, (Bharatiya Vidya Prakasan, Varanasi)
 K. D. Sethna (1981). The spirituality of the future : a search apropos of R. C. Zaehner's study in Sri Aurobindo and Teilhard de Chardin. Rutherford, [N.J.] London,
 Ramakant A. Sinari, The Structure of Indian Thought C. C. Thomas 1970 p. 244
 Zaehner, R.C. (1971) Evolution in religion: a study in Sri Aurobindo and Pierre Teilhard de Chardin, Clarendon Press, Oxford.

External links
 The Nature of Supermind, by Sri Aurobindo - an essay originally published in July 1920 and in the public domain.

Sri Aurobindo